Crematogaster corporaali is a species of ant in tribe Crematogastrini. It was described by Santschi in 1928.

References

corporaali
Insects described in 1928
Taxa named by Felix Santschi